Friesach is a historic town in the Sankt Veit an der Glan district of Carinthia, Austria. First mentioned in an 860 deed, it is known as the oldest town in Carinthia.

Geography

Location
Friesach covers an area of 120.83 km2 and its mean elevation is 631 meters above sea level.

Municipal arrangement
Friesach is divided into the following Katastralgemeinden: Friesach, St. Salvator and Zeltschach.

It can be further divided into Friesach proper and the villages and hamlets of Dobritsch, Dörfl, Engelsdorf, Gaisberg, Grafendorf, Guldendorf, Gundersdorf, Gunzenberg, Gwerz, Harold, Hartmannsdorf, Hundsdorf, Ingolsthal, Judendorf, Kräuping, Leimersberg, Mayerhofen, Moserwinkl, Oberdorf I, Oberdorf II, Olsa, Pabenberg, Reisenberg, Roßbach, Sattelbogen, Schratzbach, Schwall, Silbermann, St. Johann, St. Salvator, St. Stefan, Staudachhof, Stegsdorf, Timrian, Wagendorf, Wels, Wiegen, Wiesen, Zeltschach, Zeltschachberg, Zienitzen, Zmuck.

History
In 860 King Louis the German of East Francia donated the lands of the estate ad Friesah - derived from Slavic Breza (birch) - in the Bavarian March of Carinthia (Carantania) to Archbishop Adalwin of Salzburg. From about 740 Bavarians had crossed the Central Eastern Alps and settled among the Slavic Carantanians.

After the formation of the Duchy of Carinthia in 976, Friesach remained a southern Salzburg exclusive and a strategically important outpost. About 1076 Archbishop Gebhard of Salzburg, a follower of Pope Gregory VII in the Investiture Controversy, had the Petersberg fortress erected above the town in order to prevent Emperor Henry IV from crossing the Alps. The archbishop also had fierce enemies in the Carinthian ducal House of Sponheim, who after his deposition made several attempts to take possession of Friesach. Constant attacks by Duke Engelbert were finally repelled in 1124. In 1149 King Conrad III of Germany stayed at the castle on his way back from the Second Crusade, as did Richard the Lionheart returning from the Third Crusade in 1192, attempting to elude the guards of Duke Leopold V of Austria.

The settlement of Friesach beneath Petersberg Castle received town privileges in 1215. During the Middle Ages, it was a principal market town and commercial centre due to an important trade route from Vienna to Venice that ran through the city. The town flourished when Archbishop Eberhard II of Regensberg (1200-1246) made it the second largest city in the Archdiocese of Salzburg and the most important town in Carinthia. From local silver resources it even minted its own currency called the Friesacher Pfennig or Frizatik, widely used within the Austrian and Hungarian lands in the 12th century. The town gained in regional importance, and by the 13th century the Friesach pfennig was the standard coin used in the eastern Alps - circulated even as far as Croatia. The importance of the town diminished with the rise of the  House of Habsburg, Carinthian dukes since 1335. The fortress, however, continued to be an important power basis of the Salzburg prince-archbishops throughout the Middle Ages, once again enlarged and strengthened by Leonhard von Keutschach from 1495 onwards. It nevertheless belonged to Salzburg until the secularisation of the archbishopric in 1803, when Friesach finally fell to Carinthia.

Demographics
At the 2001 census Friesach had 5,335 inhabitants. Of that, 89.8% are Roman Catholic, 2.6% are Protestant and 1.5% are Muslims. 4.8% of the population is non-religious.

Objects of interest

The mediæval town around the Romanesque parish church of Saint Bartholomew and its city walls are preserved in quite good condition. From the 13th century on the Salzburg Archbishops stayed at the Fürstenhof residence. Other areas of interest include:
Church of St. Blaise
Dominican monastery, which contains noted medieval carvings and sculptures 
Teutonic Knights' church and hospital
Burgruine Petersberg

Economy
Friesach has several small to medium-sized industries, including metalworking and textilemaking. Like most regions of Carinthia, the town mainly depends on tourism (such as a ruined castle and a chocolate museum). With the Teutonic Order hospital, it is also a supraregional health centre.

Sustainability
In 2021, the town began fulfilling much of the electricity and hot water demands by way of the largest solar farm in Austria, a nearby 5,750 square metre installation that generates 2.8 million kilowatt-hours of power per year.

Politics

Municipal Council
At the 2009 elections, Friesach's local council (Gemeinderat) consisted of 23 members of the following parties:
13 SPÖ
5 LSM (Independent)
3 BZÖ
2 BFF (Independent)
1 FPÖ

Twin towns

Friesach is twinned with:
  Cormons, Italy
  Bad Griesbach, Germany

Notable people
 Heinrich Harrer (1912 – 2006), Austrian mountaineer, sportsman, geographer, and author of the books Seven Years in Tibet (1952) and The White Spider (1959)
 Josef Bucher (born 1965), politician
 Gerda Hofstätter (born 1971), professional billiards player
 Robert Stadlober (born 1982), actor
 Jürgen Säumel (born 1984), football player

References

External links
 Medieval Friesach official site

Cities and towns in Sankt Veit an der Glan District